Tim Dierßen (born 15 January 1996) is a German footballer who plays for Hessen Kassel as an attacking midfielder.

Club career 
Dierßen is a youth exponent from Hannover 96. He made his Bundesliga debut at 25 April 2014 against VfB Stuttgart. He substituted Szabolcs Huszti in the extra time.

On 7 July 2020, Dierßen joined Kickers Offenbach on a deal until June 2021.

Career statistics

References

External links
 Profile at Footballdatabase

1996 births
Living people
German footballers
Hannover 96 II players
Hannover 96 players
Kickers Offenbach players
KSV Hessen Kassel players
Bundesliga players
Regionalliga players
Germany youth international footballers
Association football midfielders
People from Stadthagen
Footballers from Lower Saxony